Leonard Leslie O'Shea (23 January 1920 – 22 September 2016) was an Australian rules footballer who played with South Melbourne in the Victorian Football League (VFL).

Prior to playing with South Melbourne, O'Shea served in the Australian Army during World War II.

Notes

External links 

1920 births
Australian rules footballers from Melbourne
Sydney Swans players
2016 deaths
Australian Army personnel of World War II
Military personnel from Melbourne